The Evergreen District was a high-school athletics conference in the state of Virginia that stretched from Warren County to Prince William County. The Evergreen District member schools compete 3A and 4A.  Since 2013, the district is used only for regular season competition.

The Evergreen District was created to alleviate crowding in the Northwestern District caused by Liberty and Fauquier's return from AAA. The Northwestern District was thus split into two five-team districts, with the four schools in Frederick County joining with Skyline of Warren County and keeping the Northwestern District name. Warren County, being the eastern Warren County school, joined up with Brentsville and the three Fauquier County schools to form the Evergreen District.

In 2013, Culpeper County High School and Eastern View High School entered the Evergreen District from the AA Battlefield District. The district dissolved in 2017 with the end of conference play, as most of the Evergreen District schools applied to join the Northwestern District. The lone exception was Eastern View, which chose to return to the Battlefield. The Northwestern District effectively absorbed the rest of the Evergreen District, creating a league of 13 schools.

Member schools
Brentsville District Tigers, Nokesville
Fauquier Falcons, Warrenton
Liberty Eagles, Bealeton
Kettle Run High School, Nokesville
Warren County Wildcats, Front Royal
 Culpeper County High School, Culpeper
 Eastern View High School, Culpeper
Skyline Hawks, Front Royal

Virginia High School League
Education in Fauquier County, Virginia
Education in Prince William County, Virginia
Education in Warren County, Virginia